Giovanni Antonio Guadagni (14 September 1674 – 15 January 1759) – in religion Giovanni Antonio di San Bernardo – was an Italian cardinal and a professed member from the Discalced Carmelites. His rise in the ranks became rapid after his maternal uncle became Pope Clement XII. He was soon after made a cardinal and served in various positions within the Roman Curia.

His beatification cause opened soon after his death but remained stalled until its resumption in 1940. The cause has since stalled once more.

Life

Education and priesthood
Giovanni Antonio Guadagni was born in 1674 to a noble house in the Medici-ruled Florence as the second of four children to Donato Maria Guadagni (1641-1718) and Maddalena Corsini (???-1679); his maternal uncle was Pope Clement XII. On the maternal side he was related to Saint Andrea Corsini. His siblings were (in order): Tommaso (1668-???), Neri Andrea (1673-1748), and Elisabetta.
His father married twice more after Maddalena died: to Maria Maddalena Niccolini (d. 1683) and Maria Alamanni, with whom he had four children.

He received his doctorate in civil and canon law from the Pisan college on 3 May 1696. Guadagni later travelled to Rome to practice law but upon his return to Florence in 1697 decided to become a priest. He entered the Order of Discalced Carmelites in Arezzo (against the wishes of his parents) and assumed the religious name "Giovanni Antonio di San Bernardo" at the convent in Arezzo around 1669. He made his solemn profession of vows on 1 November 1700 and would undertake theological and philosophical studies in Florence at convents that the order managed. He was ordained to the priesthood on 11 March 1702 in Florence.

Episcopate
Guadagni was later named as the master of the novices and then as the provincial father for his order. It was at the request of the Grand Duke that he was promoted to the episcopate. Pope Benedict XIII appointed him as the Bishop of Arezzo on 20 December 1724 and he received his episcopal consecration a week later in Santa Maria della Scala church from his uncle and future pope Lorenzo Corsini. But he first had to receive a special dispensation from his Carmelite vow not to accept ecclesial dignities, in order to assume the ecclesial office. Guadagni was enthroned in his new see on 9 March 1725. In 1730 he affirmed opposition and his diocese's opposition to Jansenist heresies.

His uncle's election as pope brought the bestowal of the pallium on Guadagni in the chapel of the Quirinal Palace on 22 November 1730. The pallium was normally only bestowed on metropolitan archbishops. In his uncle's pontificate, as a cardinal-nephew, he pursued the pope's pastoral and spiritual plans.

Cardinalate
Pope Clement XII raised him to the cardinalate on 24 September 1731 as the Cardinal-Deacon of Santi Silvestro e Martino ai Monti and he accepted in obedience to the pope. Guadagni arrived in Rome from Arezzo on 7 November and then entered though Porta Pia on 11 November before receiving the red hat on 22 November and his titular church on 17 December. Guadagni was enthroned in his church on 30 December at a solemn Mass. He was appointed to several important congregations in the Roman Curia and held posts in the Congregation of Bishops and Regulars and the Congregation for Rites amongst others. In 1732 he assumed the duties as the Vicar General of Rome after having resigned from his see in Arezzo. Guadagni was later appointed as the Cardinal-Bishop of Frascati in 1750 and also became the Vice-Dean of the College of Cardinals. On 10 April 1750 (two months after being made the Frascati titular head) he entered the Frascati suburbicarian see to commence a pastoral visit and oversaw the restoration of several churches while presiding over Confirmations and other Masses as well as leading rosaries. He later became the Cardinal-Bishop of Porto e Santa Rufina in 1756.

He participated in the conclave in 1740 that elected Pope Benedict XIV and also participated in the conclave in 1758 that elected Pope Clement XIII. Guadagni served as the camerlengo from 1743 until 1756.

Death
He died in Rome in 1759 and was buried at the left side of the main altar in Santa Maria della Scala in the tomb that he had constructed for himself. He also composed the inscription that was placed on the tomb. He became reputed for his holiness and was said to have been buried with the odor of saintliness.

Beatification process
The beatification process opened in Rome in 1763 in an informative process tasked with research into the late cardinal's life and his virtues and which closed in 1764. But the cause stalled at some point and remained dormant until it was reactivated under Pope Pius XII on 27 November 1940. But the cause stalled at a later point and remains so at present.

References

External links
 Catholic Hierarchy
 Hagiography Circle

1674 births
1759 deaths
17th-century Italian Christian monks
18th-century Italian cardinals
18th-century Italian Roman Catholic bishops
18th-century venerated Christians
Bishops appointed by Pope Benedict XIII
Bishops of Arezzo
Camerlengos of the Holy Roman Church
Cardinal-bishops of Frascati
Cardinal-bishops of Porto
Cardinal-nephews
Cardinal Vicars
Carmelite cardinals
Italian Servants of God
Clergy from Florence